Fredholm is a Swedish surname. Notable people with the surname include:

Erik Ivar Fredholm (1866–1927), Swedish mathematician
Fredholm alternative, in mathematics
Fredholm determinant, in mathematics
Fredholm integral equation, in mathematics
Fredholm kernel, in mathematics
Fredholm module, In noncommutative geometry
Fredholm number, in number theory, apparently not in fact studied by Fredholm
Fredholm operator, in mathematics
Fredholm's theorem, in mathematics
Analytic Fredholm theorem, in mathematics
Fredholm theory, in mathematics
Fredholm (crater), a small lunar impact crater
21659 Fredholm (1999 PR3), main-belt asteroid discovered on 1999 by P. G. Comba
 (1830–1891), Swedish industrialist
Gert Fredholm (born 1941), Danish film director and screenwriter
Patrik Fredholm (born 1978), Swedish footballer

Swedish-language surnames